Idia gopheri, the tortoise commensal noctuid moth, is a litter moth in the family Erebidae. The species was first described by J. B. Smith in 1899.

Distribution 
Idea gopher has only been recorded in Florida—from Lake Worth north to Escambia and Liberty counties, but it might also be present in southeastern Alabama and southern Georgia.

Behavior 
The moth's larvae live and feed in gopher tortoise burrows.

References

External links
"Idia gopheri - (Smith, 1899) Gopher Tortoise Noctuid Moth". NatureServe Explorer. Retrieved January 27, 2020.

Herminiinae
Moths described in 1899
Fauna of the Southeastern United States
Moths of North America